Matteo Gabbia (born on 21 October, 1999). He is an Italian professional footballer who plays as a defender for  club AC Milan.

Club career

AC Milan 
Gabbia joined AC Milan's youth academy in 2012 aged 12. He received his first ever call-up to the senior team by head coach Vincenzo Montella ahead of a home Serie A game against Roma, which was played on 7 May 2017. However, he remained an unused substitute during the match. He made his first appearance for the club on 24 August 2017, in a Europa League qualifier against Shkëndija, as a 73rd-minute substitute for Manuel Locatelli.

Loan to Lucchese 
On 31 August 2018, Gabbia was loaned to Serie C club Lucchese on a season-long loan deal. On 16 September he made his Serie C debut in a 1–0 home defeat against Arezzo, where he played the entire match. Eleven days later, on 27 September, he scored his first professional goal for Lucchese in the 47th minute of a 2–2 home draw against Carrarese. Gabbia ended his season-long loan to Lucchese with 30 appearances, all as a starter, he was replaced only 2 times, and he scored 1 goal.

Return to AC Milan 
Gabbia stayed with Milan for the 2019–20 season as a squad player behind the likes of Alessio Romagnoli, Mateo Musacchio, and Simon Kjær. On 15 January 2020, he played in the 3–0 victory against SPAL in the Coppa Italia, coming on as a substitute for Simon Kjær in the 82nd minute. He made his league debut on 17 February 2020 in a 1–0 home victory against Torino, again as a substitute for Kjær in the 44th minute. On 25 October 2022, Gabbia  scored his first Champions League goal in a 4–0 away victory over Dinamo Zagreb.

International career 
Gabbia represented Italy at the 2016 UEFA European Under-17 Championship, they did not advance from the group stage.

He played in two group-stage games for Italy U19 at the 2018 UEFA European Under-19 Championship, where Italy was the runner-up. Then with the Italy U20, Gabbia took part in the 2019 FIFA U-20 World Cup.

He made his debut with the Italy U21 on 6 September 2019, in a friendly match won 4–0 against Moldova.

Style of play 
Gabbia has been described as a versatile player. Having started his youth career as a defensive and a central midfielder, he later switched to deeper roles, such as a centre-back, in either a three or a four-man defensive line. Besides his ball-winning abilities, Gabbia also retains playmaking attributes and tends to join the attacking play when opportunities present themselves.

Career statistics

Club

Honours 
AC Milan
Serie A: 2021–22

Italy U19
UEFA European Under-19 Championship runner-up: 2018

Italy U20
FIFA U-20 World Cup fourth place: 2019

References

External links 
 Profile at the AC Milan website
 
 Matteo Gabbia at TBPlayers

1999 births
People from Busto Arsizio
Footballers from Lombardy
Living people
Italian footballers
Italy youth international footballers
Association football defenders
A.C. Milan players
S.S.D. Lucchese 1905 players
Serie C players
Sportspeople from the Province of Varese